The following is the cabinet of Chen Chien-jen, who was appointed as Premier of Taiwan on 31 January 2023 by President Tsai Ing-wen. He succeeded Su Tseng-chang, who had resigned in response to the Democratic Progressive Party's poor performance in the 2022 Taiwanese local elections. This is his first tenure of premiership, he was the Vice President of Taiwan from
2016 to 2020. This is the 4th premiership of the term of Tsai Ing-wen's presidency.

Members

Leaders

Ministries

Councils and Commissions 
Empowered by various laws, or even the Constitution, under the Executive Yuan Council several individual boards are formed to enforce different executive functions of the government. Unless regulated otherwise, the chairs are appointed by and answer to the Premier. The committee members of the boards are usually (a) governmental officials for the purpose of interdepartmental coordination and cooperation; or (b) creditable professionals for their reputation and independence.

Independent Commissions 
There are, or would be, independent executive commissions under the Executive Yuan Council. The chiefs of these five institutions would not be affected by any change of the Premier. However, the related organic laws are currently under revision.

Other organs

References

Cabinets established in 2023
Government of Taiwan